"One Sided Love Affair" (or "One-sided Love Affair") is a song by Elvis Presley from his 1956 debut album Elvis Presley.

Later, in August in the same year (1956) it was also released as a single, with "Money Honey" on the flip side.

Writing and recording history 
The song (both the words and the music) was written by Bill Campbell.

Presley recorded the song on January 30, 1956, at the RCA Studio in New York.

There were six songs handpicked by A&R person Steve Sholes himself for Presley to record for his first album at the sessions, but "One-sided Love Affair" was the only one Presley liked and recorded.

In a March 24, 1956 interview the song was cited by Presley as his favorite from the album.

Musical style and lyrics 
The book Song & Dance Man III: The Art of Bob Dylan note Presley's cynicism in the song, whose lyrics go:

The book The Art of Songwriting calls the song itself (its music and words) "unexceptional", but praises Presley's performance and the eventual result:

The book Elvis Presley, Reluctant Rebel: His Life and Our Times: His Life and Our Times describes "One-sided Love Affair" as a "rollicking" number, a "boogie-woogie polished to a pop gleam and without the barrelhouse danger, a concept already familiar in the swing era."

Track listings

Singles 
7" single (1956)
 "Money Honey" (2:32)
 "One Sided Love Affair" (2:10)

10" shellac single (RCa 20 6641, September 1956)
 "Money Honey"
 "One Sided Love Affair"
10" shellac single (1956)
 "Tutti Frutti" (2:32)
 "One Sided Love Affair" (2:10)

EPs 
2-EP set Elvis Presley (EPB-1254, April 1956)

Side 1
 "Blue Suede Shoes"
 "I'm Counting on You"
Side 2
 "Tutti Frutti"
 "Tryin' to Get to You"
Side 3
 "I Got a Woman"
 "One Sided Love Affair"
Side 4
 "I'm Gonna Sit Right Down and Cry (Over You)"
 "I'll Never Let You Go"

References

External links 
 Elvis Presley - Money Honey / One Sided Love Affair at Discogs
 Elvis Presley - Tutti Frutti / One Sided Love Affair at Discogs

1956 songs
Elvis Presley songs